Lapp Log House, also known as the Hopper Log House, is a historic home located in East Whiteland Township, Chester County, Pennsylvania. The original section dates to about 1800, and is a two-story, one bay, log structure.  The interior has an 8-foot, stone fireplace and gooseneck spiral staircase.  A two-story frame addition was built in the 1800s, with an addition built in the 1900s and former patio enclosed in 1976.  The additions take a saltbox form. The house was restored in the 1940s.  Also on the property is a contributing stone Pennsylvania bank barn.

It was added to the National Register of Historic Places in 1980.

References

Houses on the National Register of Historic Places in Pennsylvania
Houses completed in 1800
Houses in Chester County, Pennsylvania
National Register of Historic Places in Chester County, Pennsylvania